is a Japanese football player. He plays for Azul Claro Numazu.

Career
Kosuke Goto joined J3 League club Azul Claro Numazu in 2017. On June 21, he debuted in Emperor's Cup (v Kyoto Sanga FC). In August, he moved to Briobecca Urayasu.

Club statistics
Updated to 22 February 2018.

References

External links
Profile at Azul Claro Numazu

1994 births
Living people
Osaka University of Health and Sport Sciences alumni
Association football people from Shizuoka Prefecture
Japanese footballers
J3 League players
Japan Football League players
Azul Claro Numazu players
Briobecca Urayasu players
Association football defenders